Octopus sinensis (commonly the East Asian common octopus) is a mollusk belonging to the class Cephalopoda. Octopus sinensis is a well-known shallow-water benthic octopus species found in the coastal, temperature waters of South Korea, China, and Japan, with the species name, sinensis being Latin for Chinese. Octopus sinensis is closely related to the Atlantic and Mediterranean common octopus, Octopus vulgaris. Because of the morphological similarities, O. sinensis was considered synonymous with Octopus vulgaris until 2017. Octopus sinensis are carnivores that prey upon on many shallow-water animals such as crustaceans and mollusks.

Characteristics

Size and description 
The East Asian common octopus is adapted to a benthic life at the bottom of the sea. Octopus sinensis has long arms with many suckers used for catching prey, a mantle without a rigid skeleton, which allows them to inhabit and hunt in small spaces and crevices in the seabed, horizontal pupils, and versatile skin with ability to change colors and camouflage themselves with the sea floor. Compared to O. vulgaris, O. sinensis have a broader mantle and relatively shorter arms with about 80 fewer suckers. Mature O. sinensis males lack a standard sex organ, rather one of their arms (their third right arm) is specially adapted for reproduction. This arm includes erectile tissue on its tip and has a channel for sperm packets. During copulation, O. sinensis males insert their third right arm into the female's mantle. The third right arm on mature O. sinensis males has far fewer suckers than that on O. vulgaris (120-140 vs. 150–190).

Physiology 
The East Asian common octopus goes through a several-week planktonic phase, in which they are floating in the open sea. This occurs early in their development prior to their permanent benthic habitation, similar to many benthic octopus species. During their planktonic phase, the morphology of the East Asian common octopus is similar in morphology to the juvenile and adult life forms and is termed the paralarval stage after the octopus hatches. The paralarvae have certain characteristics that differ from the adult stage, which allow them to thrive in the planktonic phase, such as transparent musculature, circular pupils rather than horizontal ones, a proportionately larger mantle (2.1 mm in length) and shorter arms with fewer suckers (three to four on each arm), and a finely toothed beak. However, not much is known about the early life stages of the East Asian common octopus in their natural habitat due to their cryptic and allusive behavior. Recent studies suggest that transition from the planktonic stage to the benthic settlement is quite complex in O. sinensis and takes them a significant amount of time.

Cultural importance 
Not until 2017 was O. sinensis named a separate species from O. vulgaris on the basis of molecular and morphological features. Both species are commercially important food sources in China and both are vulnerable to over fishing. Therefore, it is important to delineate the two species for sustainable and fisheries management. In fact, some researchers claim that the misidentification of O. sinensis as O. vulgaris may be masking the decline of octopuses worldwide. catches of octopus have been steadily declining across the globe. Due to its rapid rate of growth and its high commercial value, O. sinensis is of particular interest in aquacultural cultivation. There have been several studies since the 1960s that have attempted to rear O. sinensis and O. vulgaris aquaculturally with little success. Current studies are focused on developing more accurate gene expression profiles to better understand the metabolic process and nutritional requirements of O. sinensis during its paralarval stage for aquacultural production of O. sinensis.

References 

Octopodidae
Molluscs described in 1841